John Russell, 4th Duke of Bedford,  (30 September 17105 January 1771) was an 18th-century British statesman. Bedford was a leading Whig political figure around the time of the Seven Years' War, and negotiated the Treaty of Paris which ended the conflict in 1763. He was also an early promoter of cricket and a patron of the arts who commissioned many works from artists, most notably Canaletto.

Early life

He was the fourth son of Wriothesley Russell, 2nd Duke of Bedford, by his wife, Elizabeth, daughter and heiress of John Howland of Streatham, Surrey. Known as Lord John Russell, he married in October 1731 Diana Spencer, daughter of Charles Spencer, 3rd Earl of Sunderland; became Duke of Bedford on his brother's death a year later. 

Having lost his first wife in 1735, he married, secondly, in April 1737, to Lady Gertrude Leveson-Gower (died 1794), daughter of John Leveson-Gower, 1st Earl Gower. In 1749, John Russell, 4th Duke of Bedford, was made a Knight of the Order of the Garter.

Early political career
In the House of Lords he joined the Patriot Whig opposition hostile to the Prime Minister Sir Robert Walpole, took a fairly prominent part in public business, and earned the dislike of George II. When Carteret, now Earl Granville, resigned office in November 1744, Bedford became First Lord of the Admiralty in the administration of Henry Pelham, and was made a privy councillor. He was very successful at the admiralty, but was not equally fortunate after he became Secretary of State for the Southern Department in February 1748. Pelham accused him of idleness and he was constantly at variance with his colleague The Duke of Newcastle.

Newcastle, who had previously admired The Earl of Sandwich, Bedford's successor as First Lord of the Admiralty, for his forthright and hardline views, had increasingly begun to distrust him and his relationship with Bedford. Newcastle engineered the dismissal of both of them, by sacking Sandwich in June 1751. Bedford resigned in protest, as Newcastle had calculated, allowing him to replace them with men he considered more loyal personally to him. During his time in the post, he was accused of spending far too much time at his country estate playing cricket and shooting pheasants.

Cricket
Bedford was very keen on cricket. The earliest surviving record of his involvement in the sport comes from 1741 when he hosted Bedfordshire v Northamptonshire & Huntingdonshire at Woburn Park. The combined Northamptonshire & Huntingdonshire team won. Bedford arranged the match with his friends George Montagu-Dunk, 2nd Earl of Halifax (Northants) and John Montagu, 4th Earl of Sandwich (Hunts). A few days later, there was a return match at Cow Meadow, Northampton, and the combined team won again.

By 1743, Bedford had developed Woburn Cricket Club into a leading team that was able to compete against London. The team was prominent in 1743 and 1744 but, after that, there is no further mention of it.

Seven Years' War

Lord Lieutenant of Ireland
Instigated by his friends, he was active in opposition to the government, becoming the leader of a faction named after him, the Bedford Whigs. After Newcastle's resignation in November 1756, Bedford became Lord Lieutenant of Ireland in the new government led by William Pitt and the Duke of Devonshire. He retained this office after Newcastle, in alliance with Pitt, returned to power in June 1757. 

In Ireland, he favoured a relaxation of the penal laws against Roman Catholics, but did not keep his promises to observe neutrality between the rival parties, and to abstain from securing pensions for his friends. His own courtly manners and generosity, and his wife's good qualities, however, seem to have gained for him some popularity, although Horace Walpole says he disgusted everybody (but the word "disgusting" then had a much wider range of meanings than it has today, and at its mildest meant simply "reserved").

He oversaw the Irish response to the threatened French invasion in 1759, and the landing of a small French force in northern Ireland. In March 1761, he resigned from this office.

Peace negotiator

Having allied himself with the Earl of Bute and the party anxious to bring the Seven Years' War to a close, Bedford was noticed as the strongest opponent of Pitt, and became Lord Privy Seal under Bute after Pitt resigned in October 1761. The cabinet of Bute was divided over the policy to be pursued with regard to the war, but the peace faction prevailed, and, in September 1762, Bedford went to France to open formal negations for peace.

He was considerably annoyed because some of the peace negotiations were conducted through other channels, but he signed the Peace of Paris in February 1763. Amongst other gains Britain received Canada from France and Florida from Spain. Resigning his office as Lord Privy Seal soon afterwards, various causes of estrangement arose between Bute and Bedford, and the subsequent relations between the two men were somewhat virulent.

Grenville ministry

The duke refused to take office under George Grenville on Bute's resignation in April 1763, and sought to induce Pitt to return to power. A report, however, that Pitt would only take office on condition that Bedford was excluded, incensed him and, smarting under this rebuff, he joined the cabinet of Grenville as Lord President of the Council in September 1763. His haughty manner, his somewhat insulting language, and his attitude with regard to the regency bill in 1765 offended George III, who sought in vain to supplant him, and after this failure was obliged to make humiliating concessions to the ministry. In July 1765, however, he was able to dispense with the services of Bedford and his colleagues, and the duke became the leader of a political party, distinguished for rapacity, and known as the Bedford party, or the Bloomsbury gang.

During his term of office, he had opposed a bill to place high import duties on Italian silks. He was consequently assaulted and his London residence was attacked by a mob. He took some part in subsequent political intrigues, and although he did not return to office, his friends, with his consent, joined the ministry of the Duke of Grafton in December 1767. This proceeding led "Junius" to write his "Letter to the Duke of Bedford," one of special violence. Bedford was hostile to John Wilkes, and narrowly escaped from a mob favourable to the agitator at Honiton in July 1769.

Children

Child of John Russell and his first wife Lady Diana Spencer:
John Russell, Marquess of Tavistock (died at birth 6 November 1732)

Children of John Russell and his second wife Hon. Gertrude Leveson-Gower:
Francis Russell, Marquess of Tavistock (27 September 1739 – 22 March 1767)
Lady Caroline Russell (c. January 1743 – 26 November 1811), married George Spencer, 4th Duke of Marlborough

Death
His health had been declining for some years, and in 1770 he became partially paralysed. He died at Woburn on 5 January 1771, and was buried in the Bedford Chapel at St. Michael's Church, Chenies, Buckinghamshire. His sons all predeceased him, and he was succeeded in the title by his grandson, Francis. Francis suffered heavy financial losses, and began the development of Bloomsbury on the old Bedford Estate.

The duke held many public offices: lord-lieutenant of Bedfordshire and Devon, Colonel of the East Devon Militia, and chancellor of the University of Dublin among others, and was a Knight of the Garter. Bedford was a proud and conceited man, but possessed both ability and common sense. The important part which he took in public life, however, was due rather to his wealth and position than to his personal taste or ambition. He was neither above nor below the standard of political morality of the time, and was influenced by his duchess, who was very ambitious, and by followers who were singularly unscrupulous.

He served as the twelfth Chancellor of the University of Dublin from 1765 to 1770.

References

Bibliography
 Brown, Peter Douglas. William Pitt, Earl of Chatham: The Great Commoner. George Allen & Unwin, 1978.

External links

|-

1710 births
1771 deaths
Chancellors of the University of Dublin
Diplomatic peers
404
John
Knights of the Garter
Lord High Constables of England
Lord Presidents of the Council
Lord-Lieutenants of Bedfordshire
Lord-Lieutenants of Devon
Devon Militia officers
Lords of the Admiralty
Lords Privy Seal
Members of the Privy Council of Great Britain
Secretaries of State for the Southern Department
J
Whig (British political party) politicians
Ambassadors of Great Britain to France
Fellows of the Royal Society
British Militia officers
Bedfordshire cricketers
English cricketers of 1701 to 1786
English cricketers
Cricket patrons
People from Woburn, Bedfordshire
Lords Lieutenant of Ireland
18th-century British philanthropists